Bill Baird (born March 1, 1939)  is a former American collegiate and professional football player. He played college football at San Francisco State University, where he was a defensive back, a halfback and a kick returner.  He played professionally in the American Football League for the New York Jets (1963–1969).  He, Jim Hudson, Randy Beverly, and Johnny Sample completely shut down the Baltimore Colts' passing game in Super Bowl III, helping the Jets defeat what until that time had been touted as the greatest team in professional football history.

He later served as defensive backs coach for the New York Jets from 1981–1984.

See also
List of American Football League players

References

1939 births
Living people
People from Lindsay, California
Players of American football from California
American football cornerbacks
American football safeties
San Francisco State University alumni
Sportspeople from Tulare County, California
New York Jets players
American Football League players